The women's 100m freestyle events at the 2020 World Para Swimming European Open Championships were held at the Penteada Olympic Pools Complex.

Medalists

Results

S4
Heat 1

Final

S5
Final

S6
Final

S7
Heats

Final

S8
Final

S9
Heats

Final

S10
Heat 1

Final

S11
Final

S12
Heat 1

Final

S13
Heat 1

Final

S14
Final

References

2020 World Para Swimming European Championships